Martin Krpan is a fictional character created on the basis of the Inner Carniolan oral tradition by the 19th-century Slovene writer Fran Levstik in the short story Martin Krpan from Vrh pri Sveti Trojici. Published in 1858 in the literary journal Slovenski glasnik, the popularity of the story led to it becoming a part of Slovene folklore and made its lead character a folk hero.

The story 
A Slovene subject of the Habsburg Empire and one of the strongest men in it, Martin Krpan hails from a fictional village in Inner Carniola, Hilltop by the Holy Trinity [church]. A smuggler by profession, he makes a living by illegally transporting "English salt" (probably a euphemism for gunpowder). With the help of his loyal, diminutive mare, they transport the "salt" from the Adriatic coast throughout the Slovene Lands and Inner Austria. On one of his trips, after Krpan meets the imperial carriage on a snowbound road and makes way for it by simply picking up his laden horse and moving it aside, his extraordinary strength is noted by the Emperor John. Several years later, the Emperor summons Krpan to Vienna as his last hope against Brdaus, a brutal Saracen warrior who has set up camp outside the imperial capital and issued a challenge to single combat, and has already slain most of the city's knights, including the Crown Prince. Reluctantly, Krpan accepts the challenge, scandalizing the court with his uncouthness, honesty and homespun manner before defeating the brute in a duel by using not only his strength but an unexpected reserve of ingenuity. In gratitude, the Emperor bestows him with pouch of gold pieces and - more valuably - a royal license to legally traffic in "English salt," as well an offer of his daughter's hand in marriage.

Figural representations

The story of Martin Krpan as rendered by Levstik in his epic story was first illustrated in 1917 by Hinko Smrekar. Today, Smrekar's illustrations are mainly known from the images on tarot playing cards.

In 1954, the expressionist painter Tone Kralj created a series of large full-page color illustrations of the story. His picture book, reprinted thirteen times, is now the most recognisable image of Martin Krpan.

Krpan is often depicted carrying his mare, a reference to in an iconic scene from the story in which he moves his horse to make way for the imperial carriage.

Translation in foreign languages 
english Martin Krpan, 2014 
 Martin Krpan (picture book), 2017 	 
esperanto: Martin Krpan z Vrha, 1954   
croatian: Martin Krpan, 1986   
italian: Martin Krpan, 1983   
hungarian: Martin Krpan, 1963   
macedonian: Martin Krpan, 1965   
german: Martín Krpán, 2004 
russian: Martin Krpan : slovenskaja narodnaja povest, 2011 
slovak: Martin Krpan z Vrhcu, 1950   
srbian: Martin Krpan, 1962   
belorussian. Marcin Krpan, 1982 
swedish: Martin Krpan från Vrh, 2004  	
multilingual: Martin Krpan, 2015

Notes

References

External links

 Martin Kerpan z Verha. The original story published in Slovenski glasnik (1858).
Martin Krpan - summary of the story

European folklore characters
Fictional characters with superhuman strength
Slovene mythology
Slovenian literature
Fictional Slovenian people